Zhu Yifan (born March 1, 1988, in Beijing) is a Chinese football player who currently plays as a midfielder.

Club career
Born and raised in Beijing, Zhu Yifan would join the Beijing Guoan youth team before moving to the senior team where he would eventually earn his senior team debut on June 13, 2009, in a 1-0 league victory against Tianjin Teda F.C. After his debut he would mainly be used as a substitute until February 23, 2010, saw him start his first senior game against Melbourne Victory FC in an AFC Champions League game that Beijing Guoan won 1-0.

On 31 December 2013, Zhu signed for fellow Chinese Super League side Henan Jianye.
In February 2015, Zhu transferred to fellow Chinese Super League side Changchun Yatai. In March 2016, Zhu was loaned to China League Two side Jiangxi Liansheng until 31 December 2016. In February 2017, he was loaned to League Two side Hebei Elite until 31 December 2017.

On 27 February 2019, Zhu transferred to League One newcomer Nantong Zhiyun. The following season he was dropped to the reserves after he broke club rules for having a mobile phone on him while on duty and would have to go to the Chinese Football Association for arbitration. At the end of the 2020 league season he would leave the club.

Personal life
Zhu Yifan married synchronized swimmer Fan Jiachen in December 2014.

Career statistics 
Statistics accurate as of match played 31 December 2020.

Honours

Club
Beijing Guoan
Chinese Super League: 2009

Henan Jianye
China League One: 2013

References

External links
 
Player stats at Sohu.com

1988 births
Living people
Chinese footballers
Footballers from Beijing
Beijing Guoan F.C. players
Henan Songshan Longmen F.C. players
Changchun Yatai F.C. players
Jiangxi Beidamen F.C. players
Nantong Zhiyun F.C. players
Chinese Super League players
China League One players
Association football midfielders